Featherstone is a rock band from Sweden. The band belongs to the melodic hard rock genre with roots in the 70's and 80's.

History 
The band was founded in 2012 in Gothenburg, Sweden by songwriter/multi-instrumentalist/producer Rikard Quist. After writing for and recording with several bands including Gypsy Rose, Don Patrol, Last Autumn´s Dream, White Wolf and Bangalore Choir he decided to focus on his own music.

Together with singer Lars Boden and drummer Niklas Österlund including British lyricist Jon Wilde the band got complete.

The Featherstone debut album Northern Rumble was written, recorded and produced by Rikard Quist. The final mix was made by engineer Martin Kronlund.

Members 
Lars Boden: lead vocals, backing vocals
Niklas Osterlund: drums
Rikard Quist: guitars, bass, keyboards, hammond organ, backing vocals
Jon Wilde: lyrics

With guest appearances:
Paulo Mendonca: guitars
Christian Svensson: guitars
Peter Hallin: guitars
Anders Borjesson: guitars
Annica Svensson: vocals

Discography 
 Albums
Northern Rumble (2016)
Track list:
 I Need Myself The Most
 Freedom Call
 Leave Me Be
 Look Into My Eyes
 Hole In My Heart
 Silhouettes On The Shade
 Hold On To Love
 Scandinavian Rose
 Fear Me, Save Me
 Part Of Me

References

External links 
www.featherstone.se
www.facebook.com/FeatherstoneSweden
http://planetmosh.com/featherstone-northern-rumble/
http://www.themayfairmallzine.com/cdrev16/featherstone16.html
http://sleazethiscity.com/2016/06/featherstone-northern-rumble/?fb_ref=Default
http://www.ciudadanorock.com/featherstone-northern-rumble/
http://powermetal.de/review/review-Featherstone/Northern_Rumble,28399,28320.html
http://www.rockmelodico.com/2016/04/featherstone-disco-debut-en-junio-y-dos-adelantos.html
http://heavyparadise.blogspot.se/2016/05/review-featherstone-northern-rumble-2016.html

Swedish rock music groups
Musical groups from Gothenburg